The Happy Life is a 2007 South Korean film directed by Lee Joon-ik. The film sold 1,263,835 tickets nationwide .

Synopsis 
Sang-woo, the leader of college rock band Active Volcano, dies and sets up a reunion for Gi-yeong and the other members of the group. Former bass player Seong-wook lives a hand-to-mouth existence working two jobs. Drummer Hyeok-su is a single father struggling to make a living as a car salesman. The jobless lead guitarist Gi-yeong dreams of taking over Volcano as the new frontman. When he suggests they reform the band while the old friends reminisce at the funeral, they all spurn the idea. But Gi-yeong persists and gets each to relent, setting the stage for a rock and roll reunion.

Cast 
Jung Jin-young
Kim Yoon-seok
Kim Sang-ho as Hyuk-soo 
Jang Keun-suk
Go Ah-sung
Kim Ho-jung
Chu Kwi-jung

Musical theatre adaptation 
It was adapted into a stage musical in 2008, with film/theater actor Oh Man-seok debuting as director. Oh was also the lyricist and polished the script. The story centers around two guys who are crazy about music. One is a high school music teacher, Beom-jin, who has broken up with his girlfriend and now eats sadly alone in front of his mirror out of habit. Another is the younger Sae-ki, whose mother left and whose father died in a sudden accident, leaving him an orphan. In this rather dull world, the only thing that makes these two feel alive is music, offering them their "happy life". Yoo Jun-sang and Im Choon-gil alternated as Beom-jin, and Kim Mu-yeol and Ryan alternated as Sae-ki.

References

External links

2007 films
2000s musical comedy-drama films
South Korean rock music films
Films directed by Lee Joon-ik
2000s Korean-language films
South Korean musical comedy-drama films
2007 comedy films
2007 drama films
2000s South Korean films